The Rutgers Scarlet Knights wrestling team represents Rutgers University of New Brunswick, New Jersey. The squad is coached by Scott Goodale. Goodale is a graduate 1995 of Lock Haven University. He came to Rutgers from the high school ranks. Previously he coached Jackson Memorial High School in Jackson, New Jersey where he coached four state champions.

In 2019, Nick Suriano and Anthony Ashnault became the first NCAA champions for Rutgers.

Rutgers has had All-Americans in each of the last five seasons.  Anthony Ashnault (141-149) became the first four-time All-American in program history when he finished first at the 2019 national championships in Pittsburgh. The program has had two or more All-Americans for four consecutive years: 2016, 2017, 2018 and 2019.

Founded in 2011, the Scarlet Knights Wrestling Club, Inc. (SKWC) is an independent, non-profit charitable organization with a mission to promote amateur wrestling in the United States. The SKWC is recognized as a U.S. Olympic Regional Training Center site. With this designation, the SKWC sponsors resident athletes to live and train in the New Brunswick area under the Club’s outstanding coaching staff. The SKWC also works to support the Rutgers University Wrestling program with golf outings, a 'pin pool', banquets, and post-event socials.  In 2011, the IRS approved SKWC as a tax-exempt, charitable, educational organization in accordance with IRS code Section 501(c)3.

Coach Goodale runs the Scarlet Knights Wrestling Camp, summer wrestling camps for high school students, youth and teams in New Jersey and the adjacent states of New York and Pennsylvania, featuring Rutgers wrestling coaches and athletes as staff.  It is unaffiliated with Rutgers University and the Scarlet Knights Wrestling Club.

Coaching staff
Head coach: Scott Goodale (Lock Haven '95)
Assistant coach: John Leonardis (Lehigh '97)
Assistant coach: Donny Pritzlaff (Wisconsin '02)
Director of Operations: Billy Ashnault (Rutgers '12)
Vol. Assistant Coach: Joe Pollard (Rider)
Vol. Assistant Coach: Frankie Edgar (Clarion University of Pennsylvania) Former UFC Lightweight Champion

National Collegiate Athletic Association All-Americans

Source:

National Collegiate Open Wrestling Championship All-Americans

International Wrestling Competition

Source:

References